The 2018 UK Open Qualifiers consisted of 6 darts tournaments on the 2018 PDC Pro Tour, used to determine seedings for the 2018 UK Open.

This would turn out to be the last year in which qualifiers for the UK Open would take place, as from the 2019 UK Open, all Tour Card holders would automatically qualify for the tournament.

Prize money
The prize money for the UK Open qualifiers had each event having a prize fund of £60,000.

This is how the prize money is divided:

Reuslts

Qualifier 1
Qualifier 1 was contested on Friday 2 February 2018 at the Robin Park Tennis Centre in Wigan.

Qualifier 2
Qualifier 2 was contested on Saturday 3 February 2018 at the Robin Park Tennis Centre in Wigan.  and  both hit nine-dart finishes.

Qualifier 3
Qualifier 3 was contested on Sunday 4 February 2018 at the Robin Park Tennis Centre in Wigan.  hit a nine-dart finish.

Qualifier 4
Qualifier 4 was contested on Friday 9 February 2018 at the Robin Park Tennis Centre in Wigan.  hit a nine-dart finish.

Qualifier 5
Qualifier 5 was contested on Saturday 10 February 2018 at the Robin Park Tennis Centre in Wigan.

Qualifier 6
Qualifier 6 was contested on Sunday 11 February 2018 at the Robin Park Tennis Centre in Wigan.

References

2018 in darts
2018 PDC Pro Tour